Lake Charles Transit is the operator of public transportation in Lake Charles, Calcasieu Parish, Louisiana. Five routes operate 5 days per week, each consisting of an approximately 55 minute journey in full. Currently, the city's downtown bus terminal is under re-construction, and the main hub as at the Lake Charles station.

History 
Lake Charles Transit System (LCTS) was established in 1969. Work to rebuild the Customer Service Center began in September 2011, and the new building was opened in December 2012.

Route list
1 Downtown-Ryan & Kirkman
2 Downtown-Simmons & Hwy 171
3 Downtown-Broad & Legion
4 Downtown-5th & Hwy 171
5 Prien Lake Mall & Nelson

References

External links
Official website

Bus transportation in Louisiana
Transit agencies in Louisiana
Lake Charles, Louisiana